The Secret Adventures of Tom Thumb is a 1993 British independent stop-motion/pixilation adult animated science-fantasy dystopian adventure horror film directed, written, shot and edited by Dave Borthwick, produced by bolexbrothers studio and funded by Richard Hutchinson, BBC, La Sept and Manga Entertainment, which also distributed the film on video.

The story follows the tiny Tom Thumb as he is abducted from his loving parents and taken to an experimental laboratory, and his subsequent escape. He discovers a community of similarly sized people living in a swamp, who help him on his journey to return to his parents. The film is largely dialogue-free, limited mostly to grunts and other non-verbal vocalisations.

Plot

Inside an artificial insemination factory, a mechanical wasp hovering around the establishment is crushed to death by the machinery's gears, causing its vitals to drop into one of the jars on the conveyor belt. This results in a woman giving birth to a thumb-sized fetus-like child in her and her husband's house in a grim and slum urban town. Outside, a man in a black suit witnesses the whole scene and goes to an alley to encounter Pa Thumb, who picks up a ventriloquist box-shaped doll house to make his son's bedroom. The man simply grins at him but leaves when he gets creeped out by the ventriloquist's dummy at the window of a toy shop.

Pa and Ma Thumb decide to call their diminutive son "Tom," but their time with him is short-lived. He's soon kidnapped and taken to a laboratory to be studied and experimented on. After engineering an escape with the help of one of the lab's other captives, Tom finds himself in a town populated by people his size. There he meets Jack, a young warrior who hates the bigger people, whom he and the others call giants. Nonetheless, Tom convinces Jack to help him attempt to find his father.

Production 
The Secret Adventures of Tom Thumb was made using a combination of stop-motion animation and pixilation (live actors posed and shot frame-by-frame), often with live actors and puppets sharing the frame. It was originally commissioned as a 10-minute short for BBC2's Christmas programming, but was rejected for being too dark for the festive season. The short version nevertheless garnered critical acclaim through showings at animation festivals, and a feature-length version was commissioned by the BBC a year later.

Awards
1993 - Sitges - Catalan International Film Festival - Best Director
1993 - Cinanima Espinho Portugal - Best Feature
1994 - Fantasporto - International Fantasy Film Award - Best Director
1994 - Fantasporto - Critics' Award - Special Mention
1994 - Houston Worldfest - Gold Special Jury Award - Feature Film
1994 - San Francisco International Film Festival - Best Animation
1994 - Worldfest Charleston - Gold Special Jury Award - Feature Film
1994 - Video Home Entertainment - Award of Excellence
1995 - Evening Standard British Film Award - Best Technical/Artistic Achievement
1995 - Yubari International Fantastic Film Festival - Special Jury Prize - Feature Film
1995 - Atlanta Film and Video Festival - Best Animated Film
1995 - Mediawave - Grand Prix
1995 - Mediawave - Audience Prize
1996 - Európai Animációs Játékfilm Fesztivál - 1st Prize

References
Notes

Bibliography

Toonhound - The Secret Adventures of Tom Thumb
Eye Weekly - The Secret Adventures of Tom Thumb

External links
Official website

1993 films
1993 animated films
British fantasy films
British independent films
1990s stop-motion animated films
Films based on Tom Thumb
Pixilation films
1993 fantasy films
1990s English-language films
Films directed by Dave Borthwick
British adult animated films
1990s British films